Thomas Bernard Fogarty (15 May 1909 – 9 September 1984) was an Australian rules footballer who played with St Kilda in the Victorian Football League (VFL).

Notes

External links 

1909 births
1984 deaths
Australian rules footballers from Melbourne
St Kilda Football Club players
People from Caulfield, Victoria